West Derby railway station was located on the North Liverpool Extension Line to the south of Mill Lane, West Derby, Liverpool, England. It opened on 1 December 1879.

The station closed to passengers in November 1960 closing completely five years later.

The line through the station site continued in use by freight trains until 1975, with the tracks being lifted in early 1979.

The station was about 2 miles away from Croxteth Hall which was the home of Lord Sefton.

The platforms are extant with the station building converted to a private residence and shop. The trackbed through the station site forms a part of the Trans Pennine Trail.

References

Sources

External links
 The station via Disused Stations UK
 The station on a 1948 O.S. map via npe Maps
 The station on an 1888 OS map overlay via National Library of Scotland
 The station and line HTS via railwaycodes
 The station via flickr
 The trackbed via Sustrans

Disused railway stations in Liverpool
Former Cheshire Lines Committee stations
Railway stations in Great Britain opened in 1879
Railway stations in Great Britain closed in 1960